Lhoumois is a commune in the Deux-Sèvres department in western France.

Royalist Leader and Survivor of the War in the Vendée, Charles Marie de Beaumont d'Autichamp lived the remaining years of his life in exile in Lhoumois before his death on 6 October 1859.

See also
Communes of the Deux-Sèvres department

References

Communes of Deux-Sèvres